Clouds is the third studio album by Detroit-based hip hop producer Apollo Brown, released on February 22, 2011, by Mello Music Group.

Critical reception 

Clouds received mixed reviews from critics. Roman Cooper of HipHopDX gave the album three out of five, saying that it was "more akin to a beat tape than an album". Mike Baber of RapReviews gave the album nine out of ten and called it "a very impressive and thoroughly enjoyable effort", noting that "album's sheer range and variety of songs is remarkable".

Track listing

References

External links 
 
 

2011 albums
Albums produced by Apollo Brown
Instrumental hip hop albums
Mello Music Group albums